In enzymology, an aspartate-prephenate aminotransferase is an enzyme that catalyzes the chemical reaction

L-arogenate + oxaloacetate  prephenate + L-aspartate

Thus, the two substrates of this enzyme are L-arogenate and oxaloacetate, whereas its two products are prephenate and L-aspartate.

This enzyme belongs to the family of transferases, specifically the transaminases, which transfer nitrogenous groups.  The systematic name of this enzyme class is L-arogenate:oxaloacetate aminotransferase. Other names in common use include prephenate transaminase (ambiguous), PAT (ambiguous), prephenate aspartate aminotransferase, and L-aspartate:prephenate aminotransferase.

References

 

EC 2.6.1
Enzymes of unknown structure